Richard J. Cohen (born December 10, 1949) is a Minnesota politician and a former member of the Minnesota Senate. A member of the Minnesota Democratic–Farmer–Labor Party (DFL), he represented District 64, which includes portions of the city of Saint Paul in Ramsey County.

Early life and education
Cohen was born in Saint Paul and graduated from Highland Park High School. He earned his B.A. from Northwestern University in Evanston, Illinois, and his J.D. from William Mitchell College of Law in Saint Paul.

Minnesota Legislature
Cohen was first elected to the Minnesota Legislature in 1976. He served as a member of the Minnesota House of Representatives for District 63B and, after redistricting in 1982, for District 64B. He was elected senator for District 64 in 1986, gaining the lone Republican-held Senate seat within the Twin Cities. He was reelected in the 1990, 1992, 1996, 2000, 2002, 2006, 2010, 2012, and 2016 elections.

Cohen was chair of the Senate Finance Committee from 2003 to 2011 and chair of the Senate State Government Finance Committee from 1997 to 2001.

On November 3, 2009, President Barack Obama announced Cohen's appointment to the President's Committee on the Arts and Humanities. Cohen is considered by many to be the leading champion for the arts in the Minnesota Legislature. He led the campaign to include funding for the arts in the Clean Water, Land and Legacy constitutional amendment that Minnesota voters approved in 2008.

In 2019, Erin Murphy announced that she would be running to unseat Cohen in the DFL primary.

On November 17, Cohen announced that he would not be running for re-election in 2020.

Personal life
Cohen serves on the board of the Saint Paul Chamber Orchestra. He previously served on the Guthrie Theater board.

Electoral history

References

External links

Senator Dick Cohen official Minnesota Senate website
Senator Dick Cohen  official campaign website
Minnesota Public Radio - Votetracker: Richard J. Cohen Voting Record
Project Vote Smart - Senator Richard J. 'Dick' Cohen Profile
Follow the Money - Richard Cohen Campaign Contributions
2006 2004 2002 2000 1996

Living people
1949 births
Democratic Party Minnesota state senators
Democratic Party members of the Minnesota House of Representatives
Jewish American state legislators in Minnesota
People from Ramsey County, Minnesota
Politicians from Saint Paul, Minnesota
Northwestern University alumni
William Mitchell College of Law alumni
Minnesota lawyers
21st-century American politicians
21st-century American Jews